Pushpa Bhuyan ( – 7 October 2015) was an Indian classical dancer specialising in the Indian classical dance forms of Bharatanatyam and Sattriya. She comes from the Northeast Indian state of Assam, and learned sattriya from Bhabananda Barbayan. She later studied bharatanatyam under Guru Mangudi Dorairaja Iyer. She has also tutored other dancers. A recipient of the North East Television Lifetime Achievement Award, Pushpa Bhuyan was honoured by the Government of India, in 2002, with the fourth highest Indian civilian award of Padma Shri.

See also

 Bharatanatyam
 Sattriya

References

External links
 www.pushpabhuyan.com

Recipients of the Padma Shri in arts
Performers of Indian classical dance
People from Jorhat district
Bharatanatyam exponents
Sattriya exponents
1940s births
2015 deaths
Indian female classical dancers
20th-century Indian women artists
20th-century Indian dancers
Dancers from Assam
Women artists from Assam